Major General Gordon M. "Biff" Cresswell, United States Marine Corps (USMC) (played by David Andrews) is a fictional character on the American television series JAG.

After Rear Admiral A.J. Chegwidden (portrayed by John M. Jackson) retired as Judge Advocate General of the Navy at the end of the ninth season, Gordon Cresswell, a Judge Advocate in the Marine Corps, succeeds him in the tenth season.

Career
In the show, General Cresswell is also a graduate from the United States Naval Academy like his predecessor. Prior to his featured assignment, the character used to serve as the Staff Judge Advocate to the Chairman of the Joint Chiefs of Staff. Prior to that, he served as the SJA in Iraq, where he was wounded and cited for saving a general's life. His injuries brought him to the Walter Reed Army Medical Center, where he met President George W. Bush. When Admiral Chegwidden announced his retirement, Cresswell, then a colonel, was the administration's choice for the post.

In the show, a board of Naval and Marine flag and general officers submitted Cresswell's name to Secretary of the Navy Edward Sheffield (Dean Stockwell) for the position, but allegations of impropriety prompted the Secretary of Defense to call for a full hearing by the Senate Armed Services Committee. Committee members grilled Cresswell on a variety of topics including torture, presidential power, and the legality of the war in Iraq. Though his confirmation was doubtful, Cresswell ultimately won confirmation and appointment to the grade of Major General. Cresswell's major argument during his hearing in front of the senate was that "the Law is blind. She is also an Independent. And she doesn't care if you get re-elected next year," and that the JAG position "shouldn't be political."

General Cresswell's assumption of command at JAG headquarters did not go without pain. His appointment took most of the staff by surprise, including Lieutenant Colonel Sarah MacKenzie and Commander Harmon Rabb. Also, while his direct leadership style was similar to Admiral Chegwidden's, the staff's unfamiliarity with him led to a great deal of nervousness. Added to that, Cresswell and MacKenzie were once acquainted while assigned in Okinawa. Cresswell, then the Staff Judge Advocate in Okinawa, reprimanded the man with whom MacKenzie was having an affair. Though MacKenzie had worried that Cresswell would reprimand her for the incident, she later discovered Cresswell harbored no animosity toward her, since she was the junior officer involved.

Characterization
Much like Admiral Chegwidden, General Cresswell comes off as rather hard-nosed, and bound to his post. He also is noted for lending a helping hand to his staff, and will, to the utmost of his abilities, and position, defend his staff if he knows them to be in the right in what they are doing.

He is an evangelical Christian.

Family
General Cresswell is married to Dora (Mel Harris). He also has a daughter named Cameron or "Cammie" (Daneel Harris), who attends the United States Naval Academy and is in a relationship with fellow cadet Mikey Roberts, younger brother of Cresswell's subordinate Bud Roberts, as of the end of the series.

Awards and decorations

Other Awards 
Rifle Expert 2nd award.

Pistol Expert 2nd award.

References

JAG (TV series) characters
Television characters introduced in 2004
Fictional major generals
Fictional American lawyers
Fictional Judge Advocate General's Corps (United States) personnel
Fictional United States Marine Corps personnel
Fictional Gulf War veterans
Fictional Iraq War veterans